Ma Fushou, a Hui, was the son of General Ma Qianling, and the brother of Ma Fucai, Ma Fulu, and Ma Fuxiang. He joined the martial arts hall and attended military school after three years of training in 1892.

In 1917, Ma Fushou, chief of staff of the Brillitant Military Army and defeated Bandits at Zuuqa temple. Ma Fuxiang dispatched Fushou with an army to attack Kao's army at zuuqa temple, and destroyed all the bandits.

Ma Fushou was over 90 years old when he died in 1956 in Linxia.

References

People from Linxia
Hui people
Chinese Muslim generals
19th-century births

1956 deaths
Year of birth missing